GOAL is an international association football news website founded in 2004 by Chicco Merighi and Gianluigi Longinotti-Buitoni. It is published in 19 languages, with 38 national editions and 600 contributors. It is owned by Integrated Media Company (IMC), a division of TPG Capital.

History
GOAL was acquired by Perform Group in 2011, paying £18 million to the website's investors, including Bessemer Venture Partners. In 2012, the website was investigated by HM Revenue and Customs department of the UK government over the use of unpaid interns.

In August 2016, Perform Group launched the online sports video streaming service DAZN. In September 2018 Perform Group was split into two companies: DAZN Group (named after its streaming service) for its consumer content operations, and Perform Content for its business-to-business services. Under this new structure, GOAL sat under DAZN. In March 2019, DAZN re-organized the Perform Media division into DAZN Media, which includes GOAL. In late 2020, GOAL, alongside Spox and Voetbalzone were packaged as a new company called FootballCo. Shortly after, a majority stake in FootballCo. was purchased by Integrated Media Company (IMC) which is a division of TPG Capital.

Awards
In 2017 and 2020, GOAL won the Best Sports News Site award at The Drum Online Media Awards.

GOAL50
Since the 2007–08 season, the best 50 players of the respective season are selected by GOAL reporters and ranked as part of Goal's "Goal 50." Starting from the 2018–19 season, the 50 players were divided into 25 men and 25 women, with a winner from both genders being crowned. In 2021 voting was changed, with the list of available players chosen by GOAL journalists and the ranking decided by a public vote.

Men's winners

Women's winners

NXGN
Since the 2015–16 season, GOAL has ranked the 50 best players aged under 19 for that respective season, with selections made by GOAL's network of journalists. The resulting list is known as the NXGN list, with the first-ranked players receiving the NXGN winner's award.

Since 2020, a women's list and award has also been published and handed out.

Men's winners

Women's winners

References

External links
 International edition site 

Association football websites
Football mass media in Germany
Football mass media in the United Kingdom
Football mass media in Spain
Internet properties established in 2004
Soccer mass media in the United States
2011 mergers and acquisitions